In molecular biology, snoRNAs HBII-296A and B belong to the C/D family of snoRNAs.
They are close paralogues sharing the same host gene (FLJ10534) and are predicted to guide 2'O-ribose methylation of the large 28S rRNA at position G4588.

References

External links 
 

Small nuclear RNA